Alexander William Welsh (October 12, 1907 – January 4, 1971) was a Canadian curler. He was a member of 1947 Brier Champion team (skipped by his younger brother Jimmy Welsh), playing as third, representing Manitoba. A member of the Deer Lodge Curling Club in Winnipeg, Manitoba, he was also a three-time provincial champion.

References

1907 births
1971 deaths
Brier champions
Canadian male curlers
Scottish emigrants to Canada
Curlers from Edinburgh
Curlers from Winnipeg